Otto Emil Granström (4 October 1887 – 1 May 1941) was a Finnish gymnast who won bronze in the 1908 Summer Olympics.

Gymnastics 

He won the Finnish national championship in team gymnastics as a member of Ylioppilasvoimistelijat in 1909.

Biography 

His father was railwayman Karl Otto Granström (1843–1910) and mother Johanna Elisabeth Olin (1847–1913). He married Agnes Katariina Lönn (1889–) in 1914.

He completed his matriculation exam at the Hämeenlinna Lyceum in 1906 and the forester examination in 1910. He worked in forestry up to his death, ultimately being the chief executive officer of the Hämeenlinna steam sawmill.

He served in the White Guard in the Finnish Civil War and received the Memorial Medal of the War of Independence.

References 

1887 births
1941 deaths
Finnish male artistic gymnasts
Gymnasts at the 1908 Summer Olympics
Olympic gymnasts of Finland
Olympic bronze medalists for Finland
Olympic medalists in gymnastics
Medalists at the 1908 Summer Olympics
People of the Finnish Civil War (White side)
20th-century Finnish people